{{Infobox film
| name           = The Inner Shrine
| image          = Inner Shrine poster.jpg
| caption        = Theater poster
| director       = Frank ReicherCharles Watt (assistant)
| producer       = Jesse Lasky
| writer         = Basil King (novel)Beatrice DeMilleLeighton Osmun
| starring       = Margaret Illington
| cinematography = Dent Gilbert
| editing        = 
| distributor    = Paramount Pictures
| released       = 
| runtime        = 5 reels
| country        = United States
| language       = Silent(English intertitles)
}}The Inner Shrine is a 1917 silent produced by Jesse Lasky and distributed by Paramount Pictures. It is the first of only two films that starred Margaret Illington, a noted Broadway actress. The story is from a 1909 novel, The Inner Shrine'', by Basil King, an author popular with actresses. The film is now lost.

Cast
Margaret Illington – Diane Winthrop
Hobart Bosworth – Derek Pruyn
Jack Holt – Viscount D'Arcourt
Elliott Dexter – Marquis de Bienville
Madame I. D'Juria – Madame D'Arcourt

References

External links
The Inner Shrine at IMDb.com
allmovie/synopsis

1917 films
American silent feature films
Films based on Canadian novels
Lost American films
Paramount Pictures films
1917 drama films
Silent American drama films
American black-and-white films
1917 lost films
Lost drama films
Films directed by Frank Reicher
1910s American films